C2 Pictures was an American independent media-entertainment company, it specialized in film and television production.

History 
The company was established in 1998 by Carolco Pictures co-founders Andrew G. Vajna (who had formed Cinergi Pictures until it folded in this same year) and Mario Kassar. In 1999, VCL Communications and Toho-Towa were attached as partners on the then-upcoming feature film Terminator 3: Rise of the Machines. The company assigned Metro-Goldwyn-Mayer the right to co-produce Basic Instinct 2. Both sequels were co-produced by international backer Intermedia.

The company's first production was action comedy film I Spy (2002). Though this film was the company's first, Kassar and Vajna's initial purpose for forming the new company was to resurrect the Terminator franchise. In 2008, the company fell into dormancy and eventually was dissolved.

Filmography

Television series

References

 
Film production companies of the United States
Mass media companies established in 1998
1998 establishments in the United States
Mass media companies disestablished in 2008